Samuel Cooper (16095 May 1672), sometimes spelt as Samuel Cowper, was an English miniature painter, and younger brother of Alexander Cooper.

Life
He is believed to have been born in London, and was a nephew of John Hoskins, the miniature painter, by whom he was educated.
He lived in Henrietta Street, Covent Garden, and frequented the Covent Garden Coffee-House. Samuel Pepys, who makes many references to him, tells us he was an excellent musician, playing well upon the lute, and also a good linguist, speaking French with ease. According to other contemporary writers, he was a short, stout man, of a ruddy countenance. He married one Christiana, whose portrait is at Welbeck Abbey, and he had one daughter. Christiana's sister Edith was the mother of Alexander Pope.

In 1668 he was instructed by Pepys to paint a portrait of Mrs Pepys, for which he charged £30. He is known to have painted also the portrait of John Aubrey, which was presented in 1691 to the Ashmolean Museum. From his correspondence with John Ray, the naturalist. John Evelyn refers to him in 1662, when, on the occasion of the visit that the diarist paid to the king, Cooper was drawing the royal face and head for the new coinage.

Examples of his work are to be found at Windsor Castle, Belvoir Castle, Montague House, Welbeck Abbey, Ham House, the Rijksmuseum in Amsterdam and in the collection of Mr J. Pierpont Morgan. His largest miniature is in the possession of the Duke of Richmond and Gordon at Goodwood. A piece of the artists handwriting is to be seen at the back of one of his miniatures in the Welbeck Abbey collection, and one of his drawings in black chalk is in the University Gallery at Oxford. His own portrait of himself is in the collection of Mr J. Pierpont Morgan.

The date of his death has been handed down by a record in the diary of Mary Beale, the miniature painter; and in some letters from Mr Charles Manners, addressed to Lord Roos, dated 1672, now amongst the Duke of Rutland's papers at Belvoir, the writer refers to Cooper's serious illness on 4 May 1672, and to his doubt as to whether the artist would ever recover. Mary Beale's reference to his decease is in the following words: "Sunday, May 5, 1672 Mr Samuel Cooper, the most famous limner of the world for a face, died."

He is buried in St Pancras Old Church in London. His baroque memorial lies on the far east wall of the church.

According to the art historian George Charles Williamson, "There is urgent demand for a memoir of Samuel Cooper. The details of his life are hardly known. ... The early part of his artistic career he spent in Paris and Holland, and it is very likely that careful research in the records of the Bibliothèque Nationale might reveal information respecting him which would be of the greatest interest."

Notes

References

Sources
G. C. Williamson, History of Portrait Miniatures, Volume 1 (London: George Bell & Sons, 1904) p. 64.

External links

Attribution

1609 births
1672 deaths
People from Covent Garden
17th-century English painters
English male painters
Portrait miniaturists